Chinese Peak is a summit in Bannock County, Idaho, in the United States. This peak is the highest point in the portion of the Portneuf Range called the Pocatello Range. The peak is a fire lookout site and a road/bike trail leads to the top.

Formerly called Chinks Peak, the summit was named for a Chinese man who died near the summit in the 1890s. Following controversy over the use of ethnic slur "chink", the name was officially changed by the Geographic Names Information System in 2001.

References

Mountains of Bannock County, Idaho
Mountains of Idaho
Chinese-American culture in Idaho